Riverview Cemetery is a cemetery in the eastern United States, located in Trenton, New Jersey. A number of notables are interred there, including Civil War Union Army Major General and New Jersey Governor George B. McClellan, whose grave is marked by the tallest monument in the cemetery. His wife, Mary Ellen Marcy McClellan, is interred with him.

History
Riverview Cemetery dates back to a Quaker graveyard used in the 1670s overlooking the Delaware River.  The cemetery was established in 1699, and was incorporated in 1858 by an act passed by the New Jersey Legislature. It still serves the community today as an active cemetery, with an office and full-time staff. It was expanded and formally landscaped in the 19th century, becoming the burial site of many prominent Trentonians of the era.

The cemetery was listed on the National Register of Historic Places in 2017.

Notable interments
Other notables interred in Riverview are:
 George Antheil (1900–1959), American composer
 William Archinal (1840–1919), Civil War Medal of Honor Recipient
 John T. Bird (1829–1911), represented New Jersey's 3rd congressional district from 1869 to 1873.
 J. Hart Brewer (1844–1900), represented New Jersey's 2nd congressional district in the United States House of Representatives from 1881 to 1885.
 Frank O. Briggs (1851–1913), United States Senator from New Jersey
 William L. Dayton (1807–1864), United States Senator from New Jersey and Republican Party Vice Presidential Candidate.
 William Halstead (1794–1878), United States Congressman from New Jersey and Civil War Army officer (founder and first Colonel of the 1st New Jersey Volunteer Cavalry regiment)
 George Peter Ihrie (1827–1903), Civil War Union Brevet  Brigadier General.
 Walter Scott Lenox (1859–1920), founder of Lenox china
 Randolph B. Marcy (1812–1887, Civil War Union Army Brigadier General, and father of Mary Ellen Marcy McClellan
 George B. McClellan (1826–1885), Civil War Union Army Major General, 24th Governor of New Jersey 1878 to 1881
 Gershom Mott (1822–1884), Civil War Union Army Major General
 A. Dayton Oliphant (1887–1963), Justice of the New Jersey Supreme Court from 1945 to 1946, 1948 to 1957.
 Samuel D. Oliphant (1824–1904), Civil War Union Army Brevet Brigadier General
 D. Lane Powers (1896–1968), United States Congressman from New Jersey
 John Augustus Roebling (1800–1869), German-American industrialist and civil engineer, designer of the Brooklyn Bridge.
 James F. Rusling (1834–1918), Civil War Union Army Brevet Brigadier General.
 'Edward W. Scudder (1822–1893) was a Justice of the New Jersey Supreme Court from 1869 until his death.
 John Taylor (1837–1909), served in the New Jersey Senate and was the creator of Pork roll.
 William S. Truex (1819–1889), Civil War Union Army Brevet Brigadier General.
 Bennett Van Syckel (1830–1921) Associate Justice of the New Jersey Supreme Court from 1889 to 1900
 Evan M. Woodward (1838–1904), Civil War Medal of Honor Recipient

See also
 List of United States cemeteries

References

External links
 Cemetery transcriptions
 Tombstone Inscriptions of Persons Born before 1820 And Buried in Riverview Cemetery Trenton, New Jersey, Trenton Historical Society
 Riverview Cemetery at The Political Graveyard
 
 Interment.net

1699 establishments in New Jersey
Cemeteries in Mercer County, New Jersey
Tourist attractions in Trenton, New Jersey
Cemeteries on the National Register of Historic Places in New Jersey
National Register of Historic Places in Mercer County, New Jersey